Siti or SITI may refer to:

People
 Siti (given name), a common Malay female given name
 Siti Kassim (born 1961), Comorian politician
 Siti Mwinyi (born 1932), Tanzanian first lady
 Beáta Siti (born 1973), Hungarian handball player and coach
 Eszter Siti (born 1977), Hungarian handball player
 Walid Siti (born 1952), Kurdish artist
Siti Badriah (born 1991), musical artist Dancedhut at the Productions Nagaswara

Places
 Siti Hydroelectric Power Station (disambiguation)

Other
 Siti, character in Opera Jawa
 Saratoga International Theater Institute, theater  company in New York, United States
 SITI: An Iconic Exhibition of Dato' Siti Nurhaliza
 Siti (film), 2014 Indonesian film
 Siti Networks, Indian cable television company
 Siti language, Gurunsi language of Ghana, in the Niger-Congo family
Stevens Institute of Technology International, former private university in Dominican Republic

See also